Victor Crivoi and Petru-Alexandru Luncanu were the defending champions but only Luncanu decided to defend his title, partnering Kamil Majchrzak. Luncanu lost in the first round to Jonathan Eysseric and Tristan Lamasine.

Robin Haase and Tim Pütz won the title after defeating Lamasine and Eysseric 6–4, 6–2 in the final.

Seeds

Draw

References
 Main Draw

Sibiu Open - Doubles